Gabriel Company Bauzá (born 16 May 1930 in Sant Joan, Mallorca) is a Spanish former racing cyclist. In 1958 he won the Vuelta a Andalucía. He also finished 6th overall and won a stage of the 1955 Vuelta a España, and won a second stage in 1961.

Major results

1953
 2nd Campeonato Vasco Navarro de Montaña
1954
 5th Overall Volta a Catalunya
1955
 1st  Overall Circuito Montañes
 1st Trofeo Masferrer
 1st Trofeo del Sprint
 1st Stage 5 Euskal Bizikleta
 2nd Overall Volta a Catalunya
1st Stage 2
 2nd GP Pascuas
 3rd Overall Vuelta a Asturias
 6th Overall Vuelta a España
1st Stage 5
1956
 1st Clásica a los Puertos de Guadarrama
 4th Trofeo Masferrer
1957
 1st Stage 5 Volta a Catalunya
 1st Stage 8 Vuelta a Andalucía
 4th Overall Vuelta Ciclista a la Comunidad Valenciana
1958
 1st  Overall Vuelta a Andalucía
 2nd Trofeo Masferrer
 2nd National Hill Climb Championship
1959
 1st Trofeo Masferrer
 6th Overall Vuelta Ciclista a la Comunidad Valenciana
 7th Overall Vuelta a Andalucía
 7th Campeonato Vasco Navarro de Montaña
1960
 1st Stage 6 Vuelta a Andalucía
 8th Trofeo Masferrer
1961
 1st Stage 16 Vuelta a España
 2nd Overall Madrid–Barcelona

References

External links
 

1930 births
Living people
Spanish male cyclists
Sportspeople from Ibiza
Spanish Vuelta a España stage winners
Cyclists from the Balearic Islands